Bulgaria is a NATO member country with a large indigenous defence industry. Most of its weaponry is of Soviet design, but with significantly improved performance. Bulgaria is ranked as a "medium" small arms exporter according to the Small Arms Survey.

History 
Despite having local arms factories, until 1944 Bulgaria relied mostly on imports to equip its military. Nevertheless, the Bulgarian defence industry was capable of producing training and light attack aircraft, such as the DAR-10 and Laz-7. After the installment of a Communist government the same year, the country started a process of massive industrialization, but continued to import equipment. By the 1980s a large part of the equipment came from local suppliers. In the late 1980s exports reached about $800 mln. annually, trade partners being mostly Egypt, Algeria, Angola, North Korea, Libya, Syria, Iraq, Cuba and Vietnam.

After the loss of Warsaw Pact and secondary markets, surplus weapons, as well as newly manufactured items, were illicitly exported to a variety of countries and rebel groups across Africa and Asia.

Manufacturers 
 Arsenal AD – oldest weapons manufacturer (est. 1878), largest machine-building company in the country; produces pistols, sub-machine guns, assault rifles, light machine guns, machine guns, grenade launchers, mortars, air-defense systems, anti-tank grenade launchers, automatic grenade launchers, ammunition for small arms, artillery rounds, bombs, anti-tank weapons ammunition, unguided rockets and others;
 TEREM – Government owned specializing in servicing equipment and producing ammunition and spares;
 VMZ Sopot – Government owned produces anti-tank guided and unguided missiles, aviation unguided missiles and artillery ammunition;
 Kintex – Government owned produces ammunition, bombs, unguided rockets, fuses, mines and communication equipment;
 Samel 90 – communication equipment, surface-to-air missiles and others;
 Armstechno – drones and UAVs;
 THOR Global Defense Group – Small Arms and Long Range Systems – Franchise Office;
 Apolo GmbH – uniforms;
 State military technology institute
 MARS Armor Ltd. – body armor and personal ballistic protection solutions.
 Armaco JSC

Products

Small arms 
 AR series – AR-M1 assault rifle and others. The basic AR-M1 is chambered in 5.56x45mm, has a 600 rpm rate of fire, 900 m/s muzzle velocity, nearly 600 g lighter than the original AK-74 (loaded weight), somewhat more durable, a rail for an optical or reflex sights.
 AKS-74u assault rifle
 Arsenal Shipka submachine gun
 LMG light machine gun
 MG-M1 general purpose machine gun
 Arcus 98DA pistol
 Makarov PM pistol

Artillery 
 Mortars – 60–120 mm
 2S12 Tundzha SP mortars (two variants – 82 and 120 mm)
 2S1 Karamfil SP howitzers

Air defence equipment 
 SA-7B Grail MANPADS
 SA-14 Gremlin MANPADS
 SA-16 Gimlet MANPADS
 SA-18 Grouse MANPADS

Anti-tank weapons 
 SPG-9DNM recoilless rifle
 RPG-7 grenade launcher
 RPG-22 one-shot disposable rocket launcher (issued as a round of ammunition)
 AT-3 Sagger ATGM
 AT-4 Spigot ATGM
 AT-5 Spandrel ATGM

Armored vehicles 

 MT-LB in different versions
 BMP-23
 BTR-60:
 BTR-60PAU – Artillery command variant of the BTR-60PA with 4 whip antennas.
 BTR-60PB with Polish WAT turret from SKOT-2AP. Only a prototype was made.
 BTR-60PB-MD (bronyetransport’or moderniziran) – BTR-60PB upgraded with VAMO DT3900 or Rover TD-200 diesel engine, four MB smoke grenade dischargers on the turret (two on each side), "Melopa" night sight, new day sight, new NBC protection system and modern radios. It also has a rear view mirror on the left hand side of the hull. Only a prototype was made.
 BTR-60PB-MD1 – Version for the Bulgarian army, powered by a Cummins ISB 25.30 turbocharged Euro 3 diesel engine of 250 hp and fitted with side hatches. About 150 in service.
 BTR-60PB-MD3 – export model, fitted with a KamAZ diesel engine, different sights and eight additional smoke grenade launchers in the front right corner of the hull. The prototype, shown in 2004, was based on a BTR-60PA.

Missiles and rockets 
 Rockets for BM-21
 S-5 rocket

Ammunition 
 Starshel ECM round
 RPG rounds
 5.45, 5.56, 7.62, 9, 12.7, 14.5, 23, 40, 57, 60, 73, 81, 82, 100, 120, 122, 125, 130, 152 mm ammunition

Other 
 Armstechno NITI drone
 Armstechno Dulo UCAV
 jammers for remotely detonated bombs
 UBGL-1 underbarrel grenade launcher in different variants
 handheld radios
 guidance systems for missiles
 avionics for aircraft
 uniforms and helmets
 optical instruments
 night vision equipment
 body armor and bulletproof vests

Customers

References

External links 
 Arsenal Corporation
 TEREM
 Samel90
 Apolo
 MARS Armor

Defence companies of Bulgaria
Bulgaria